The Rolling River First Nation is an Ojibwe First Nations community in Manitoba, located south of Riding Mountain National Park.

About half of the members are resident on its reserves, which are located south and east of Erickson, Manitoba.

Reserve lands 
Rolling River First Nation is in possession of three reserves:

Bordered mostly by the RM of Harrison, it also has a significant border with the RM of Clanwilliam, as well as a much smaller border with the RM of Minto.
 Rolling River 67A — has a total size of 
 Rolling River 67B — has a total size of 
 Rolling River 67C — has a total size of 
 Treaty Four Reserve Grounds 77 — a reserve shared with several other First Nations; it has a total size of

External links
 Map of Rolling River 67 at Statcan

References 

 INAC - Rolling River First Nation

 
West Region Tribal Council
Ojibwe governments
First Nations governments in Manitoba